Glenys Bauer (née Williams) is a retired Australian women's basketball player.

Biography
Bauer played for the Australia women's national basketball team at the 1971 FIBA World Championship for Women, hosted by Brazil. A long-serving player at club level, Bauer is a member of Basketball SA's 300 Club.

References

Living people
Australian women's basketball players
Year of birth missing (living people)
Guards (basketball)